Yāndūn (烟墩) may refer to:

 Yandun, Nanling County, town in Anhui, China
 Yandun, Lingshan County, town in Guangxi, China